The 2012 Lima Challenger was a professional tennis tournament played on clay courts. It was the sixth edition of the tournament which was part of the 2012 ATP Challenger Tour. It took place in Lima, Peru between 2 and 8 July 2012.

Singles main draw entrants

Seeds

 1 Rankings are as of June 25, 2012.

Other entrants
The following players received wildcards into the singles main draw:
  Mauricio Echazú
  Sergio Galdós
  Jorge Herreros
  Rodrigo Sánchez

The following players received entry from the qualifying draw:
  Facundo Mena
  Roberto Quiroz
  Ricardo Siggia
  Harel Srugo

Champions

Singles

 Guido Andreozzi def.  Facundo Argüello, 6–3, 6–7(6–8), 6–2

Doubles

 Facundo Argüello /  Agustín Velotti def.  Claudio Grassi /  Luca Vanni, 7–6(7–4), 7–6(7–5)

References

External links

Lima Challenger
Lima Challenger
July 2012 sports events in South America
2012 in Peruvian sport